These lists of unsolved murders include notable cases where victims were murdered in unknown circumstances.

 List of unsolved murders (before the 20th century)
 List of unsolved murders (1900–1979)
 List of unsolved murders (1980–1999)
 List of unsolved murders (2000–present)

See also

 Cold case
 Forensic science
 List of fugitives from justice who disappeared
 List of kidnappings
 Lists of people who disappeared
 List of unsolved deaths
 List of unsolved murders in Canada
 List of unsolved murders in the United Kingdom
 List of unsolved murders in Australia
 Lists of people by cause of death
 Unidentified decedent

External links

Unsolved